The 1886 Nevada gubernatorial election was held on November 2, 1886.

Republican nominee Charles C. Stevenson defeated incumbent Democratic Governor Jewett W. Adams with 52.41% of the vote.

General election

Candidates
Major party candidates
Jewett W. Adams, Democratic, incumbent Governor
Charles C. Stevenson, Republican, Regent of the University of Nevada

Results

Notes

References

1886
Nevada
Gubernatorial